Uniiq is a public radio station in Accra, the capital town of the Greater Accra Region of Ghana. The station is owned and run by the state broadcaster - the Ghana Broadcasting Corporation.

References

Radio stations in Ghana
Greater Accra Region
Mass media in Accra